Made in Basing Street is the first album by the English supergroup Producers, now known as The Trevor Horn Band, released on 25 June 2012. As the album's name suggests, it was mainly recorded at the legendary SARM Studios (formerly known as 'Basing Street Studios') in Notting Hill, which is now owned by producer and Producers member Trevor Horn, and was used to record such famous albums as Led Zeppelin IV and Queen's News of the World.

The album's cover features a QR code which, when decoded, links to the former location of the band's now-defunct official website.

History
Producers was formed in 2006 as a live act, allowing its members to play songs from their vast histories as record producers. They also wrote some new songs together (such as "Freeway" and "Barking Up the Right Tree") which they added to their live sets, before deciding to produce their own album. The album was originally announced as early as 2007 under the name Studio 1, when "Barking Up the Right Tree" was released as a single with "Freeway" as a B-side on the Stiff Records label. It was later renamed "Watching You Out There" (the name of a song which appears on the final product). At one point, following Chris Braide's departure when the band briefly went by the name 'US', the band had planned a concept album entitled The Path of Sydney Arthur, which would have told the story of a man born on the same day as the 1969 Moon landing. Made in Basing Street is the final product of these six years' work by the band. Though Chris Braide was no longer a member of the band by the time the album was completed, he receives writing and production credits on every track.

Track listing
All tracks written by Chris Braide, Lol Creme, Trevor Horn, Steve Lipson and Ash Soan.

"Freeway" – 5:14
"Waiting for the Right Time" – 4:15
"Your Life" – 6:26
"Man on the Moon" – 4:02
"Every Single Night in Jamaica" – 5:16
"Stay Elaine" – 3:44
"Barking Up the Right Tree" – 3:21
"Garden of Flowers" – 4:14
"Watching You Out There" – 5:35
"You and I" – 5:47

Deluxe edition disc two 
"Your Life" (extended version) – 7:40
"Garden of Flowers" (alternative version, with guitar intro) – 5:53
"Seven" – 3:50
"There's Only So Much You Can Do" – 3:29
"Freeway" (extended version) – 12:08 [actually 6:46, as it also includes a hidden bonus track: a live instrumental version of "Two Tribes" – 4:50]

Personnel

Main 
Lol Creme – guitars, marimba, bass, backing vocals, lead vocals (7), keyboards, percussion
Ash Soan – drums, percussion; acoustic guitar (7)
Stephen Lipson – guitars, mandolin, percussion, programming; backing vocals (1); bass (4); vocals (7)
Trevor Horn – bass, backing vocals; lead vocals (3,5,8); acoustic guitar (3); vocoder (5); marimba (8)
Chris Braide – vocals, keyboards; acoustic guitar (2); glockenspiel (3)

Other 
Geoff Downes – organ, keyboards, Rhodes, piano
Ryan Molloy – vocals (1, 4, 6); backing vocals (2, 3)
Luís Jardim – percussion (3, 7)
Simon Bloor – glockenspiel (8)
Kirsten Joy – backing vocals (1)
Kate Westall – backing vocals (1)
Lucy Monaghan – "giggle girl" (6)

References

2012 debut albums
Albums produced by Trevor Horn
ZTT Records albums